Rita Renoir (19 January 1934 – 4 May 2016) was a French strip-teaser and actress.

Biography 
Renoir was the Vedette of the Crazy Horse Saloon, in Paris, between the 1950s and 1960s, becoming one of the most famous European strip-teasers.

In 1964 Renoir was chosen by Michelangelo Antonioni to play the role of Emilia in The Red Desert, and the following year she made her theatrical debut in René de Obaldia's Du vent dans les branches de sassafras, alongside Michel Simon. In 1967 Renoir was the lead actress in Jean-Jacques Lebel's representation of the Pablo Picasso's drama Le Désir Attrapé par la Queue (Desire Caught by the Tail).

Filmography 
 1953 : Les Compagnes de la nuit
 1958 : Le Sicilien
 1962 : Commandant X (TV)
 1963 : Mondo di notte n. 3
 1963 : Dragées au poivre
 1964 : Ni figue ni raisin (TV)
 1964 : The Red Desert
 1966 : Chappaqua
 1967 : Fantômas contre Scotland Yard
 1970 : Cannabis
 1975 : Le Futur aux trousses
 1981 : Sois belle et tais-toi
 1982 : The Angel
 1984 : Lire c'est vivre : Élie Faure, Vélasquez et les Ménines (TV)

References

Further reading 
 Frank Horvat, Patrick Lindermohr, J'aime le strip-tease, Éditions Rencontres, 1962
 « Entretien avec Rita Renoir », in Plexus, la revue qui décomplexe, n° 3, Paris, août-septembre 1966
 Julio Cortázar, Homenaje a una joven bruja, in Territorios, Mexico-Madrid-Buenos Aires, Siglo Veintiuno, 1978
 Jean-Pierre Georges, Le Diable et la Licorne : métaphysique du strip-tease, Paris, La Table ronde, 2004

External links 
 
 Jean-Michel Palmier, « Rita Renoir : Les Voyeurs attrapés par la queue », in Politique Hebdo.

1938 births
2016 deaths
French film actresses
French television actresses
French stage actresses
20th-century French actresses